Hlinaia may refer to several places in Moldova:

 Hlinaia, Edineţ, a commune in Edineţ district
 Hlinaia, Grigoriopol, Transnistria, a commune in Grigoriopol sub-district, Transnistria
 Hlinaia, Slobozia, Transnistria, a commune in Slobozia sub-district, Transnistria